Euphorbia helioscopia, the sun spurge or madwoman's milk, is a species of flowering plant in the spurge family Euphorbiaceae. It is a herbaceous annual plant, native to most of Europe, northern Africa, and eastward through most of Asia.

Additional folk names include wart spurge, summer spurge, umbrella milkweed, and wolf's-milk.

Description 
It is an annual plant growing in arable land and disturbed ground. It grows to 10–50 cm tall, with a single, erect, hairless stem, branching toward the top. The leaves are oval, broadest near the tip, 1.5–3 cm long, with a finely toothed margin. The flowers are small, yellow-green, with two to five basal bracts similar to the leaves but yellower; flowering lasts from mid-spring to late summer.

Uses 
It is highly poisonous. Active ingredients are extracted from it for use in pharmaceutical industry. It is also a plant used in Chinese traditional medicine.
Its extract has been found to inhibit hepatocellular carcinoma in vivo in mice and in vitro in human cells.

Chemistry 
Euphorbia helioscopia contains the jatrophone-type diterpenoids euphoheliosnoid A, B, C and D and other toxic diterpenes such as euphoscopins, epieuphoscopins euphornins, cuphohelioscopins and euphohelionone.

Four esters of 12-deoxyphorbol (12-deoxyphorbol-13-phenylacetale-20-acetate, 12-deoxyphorbol-13-dodec-dienoate-20-acetate, 12-deoxyphorbol-13-[2-methyl-cis-2-butenoate]-20-acetate and 12-deoxyphorbol-13-[2-methyl-cis-2-butenoate]) can be isolated from the fresh aerial parts. These substances are the major skin irritants found in the plant.

m-Hydroxyphenylglycine and 3,5-dihydroxyphenylglycine are two amino acids that can be isolated from the latex of E. helioscopia.

Hydrolysable tannins can be found in E. helioscopia. Helioscopinin A (1,6-(S)-hexahydroxydiphenoyl-2,4-(S)-dehydrohexahydroxydiphenoyl-3-O-galloyl-β-D-glucose), helioscopinin B (1,6-(S)-hexahydroxydiphenoyl-3-O-galloyl-β-D-glucose), helioscopin A (1,6-(S)-hexahydroxydiphenoyl-2,4-(R)-elaeocarpusinoyl-3-O-galloyl-β-D-glucose) and helioscopin B (1,3,6-tri-O-galloyl-2,4-(R)-elaeocarpusinoyl-β-D-glucose) can be found together with eight other tannins: corilagin, punicafolin, geraniin, elaeocarpusin, furosin, terchebin, mallotusinin and carpinusin. Helioscopinin-A shows anti-allergic and anti-asthmatic activities in guinea pigs. It is suggested that this compound exerts its activities through antagonism on leukotriene D4-induced responses.

References 

helioscopia
Flora of Lebanon
Plants described in 1753
Taxa named by Carl Linnaeus
Flora of Malta